The 2006–07 Montreal Canadiens season was the club's 98th season, 90th in the National Hockey League. The club finished fourth in the Northeast division and missed qualification for the playoffs by two points after losing the final game of the regular season 6–5 against the Toronto Maple Leafs.

Pre-season
The Canadiens were only minimally active in offseason transactions, with forwards Sergei Samsonov and Mike Johnson and defenceman Janne Niinimaa representing the only additions. Forwards Jan Bulis, Richard Zednik and Mike Ribeiro moved to other teams: Bulis via free agency to Vancouver, Zednik via a trade to Washington and Ribeiro via a trade to Dallas (for Niinimaa).

Regular season
The club intended to build on a 2005–06 season in which it took the eventual Stanley Cup champion Carolina Hurricanes to six games in the first round of the playoffs.  Behind the leadership of goaltender Cristobal Huet and captain Saku Koivu, the Canadiens poised themselves to join the elite of the Eastern Conference.

However, the team failed to keep its momentum for the whole season. Cristobal Huet's injury on February 15, 2007, forced the Canadiens to use backup goaltenders Jaroslav Halak and David Aebischer. Despite Halak's decent performance, the Canadiens could not clinch a playoff spot. They were eliminated on April 8 after a 6–5 loss against the Toronto Maple Leafs during the season's last game.

On January 9, 2007, the NHL announced that Sheldon Souray had been voted by the fans to start at defence in the 2007 All-Star Game in Dallas.

The Canadiens finished the regular season with the NHL's best power-play percentage, at 22.75% (86 for 378), and tied the Ottawa Senators for most shorthanded goals scored, with 17.

Season standings

Schedule and results

October

Record for month: 6–2–3 (home: 3–1–2; away: 3–1–1).

November

Record for month: 8–5–0 (home: 4–2–0; away: 4–3–0).

December

Record for month: 8–4–2 (home: 5–1–1; away: 3–3–1).

January

Record for month: 6–7–0 (home: 4–3–0; away 2–4–0).

February

Record for month: 5–9–1 (home: 3–5–0; away 2–4–1).

March

Record for month: 8–5–0 (home: 6–0–0; away: 2–5–0).

April

Record for month: 1–2–0 (home: 1–0–0; away 0–2–0).

 Green background indicates win.
 Red background indicates regulation loss.
 White background indicates overtime/shootout loss.

Player stats

Transactions

Trades

Free agents acquired

Free agents lost

Claimed off waivers

Draft picks
Montreal's picks at the 2006 NHL Entry Draft in Vancouver, British Columbia.  The Canadiens had the 16th overall draft pick, which they traded to the San Jose Sharks for the 20th and 53rd overall picks.

Awards and records
 King Clancy Memorial Trophy: Saku Koivu

External links
 Official site of the Montreal Canadiens

See also
 2006–07 NHL season

References
 Team standings: NHL standings on espn.com
 Game log: Montreal Canadiens game log on espn.com
 Season Stats:  on espn.com

Montreal Canadiens seasons
Montreal Canadiens season, 2006–07
Montreal